Lushan Avenue Subdistrict is a subdistrict situated inside of Hedong District, Tianjin. it shares border with Huaming Subdistrict to the north and east, Wanxin and Dongxin Subdistricts to the south, and Changzhou Avenue Subdistrict to the west. Its total population was 43,109 as of 2010.

The subdistrict was founded in 1993. Its name literally means "Lu Mountain Avenue".

Administrative divisions 
So far in 2021, Lushan Avenue Subdistrict has these 8 communities:

References 

Township-level divisions of Tianjin
Hedong District, Tianjin